Properigea loculosa is a moth in the family Noctuidae. It is found in South-Western North America, including Arizona and Mexico.

The wingspan is about 25 mm.

External links
Images

Xyleninae